Wu is a concept of awareness, consciousness, or spiritual enlightenment in the Chinese folk religion.

According to scholarly studies, many practitioners who have recently "reverted" to the Chinese traditional religion speak of an "opening of awareness" or "awakening of awareness" of the interconnectedness of reality in terms of the cosmic-moral harmony (bào yìng) as it relates to mìng yùn and yuán fèn.

This spiritual awareness, wu, works as an engine that moves these themes from being mere ideas to be motivating forces in one's life:
 awareness of mìng yùn ignites responsibility towards life;
 awareness of yuan fen stirs one to respond to events rather than resigning.

Awareness is a dynamic factor and appears in two guises: first, as a realisation that arrives as a gift, often unbidden, then as a practice that the person intentionally follows.

See also
 Chinese folk religion
 Ming yun
 Bao ying
 Yuan fen
 Satori, a similar concept in Japanese Buddhism

References

Bibliography

  Preprint from The Oxford Handbook of Religious Conversion, 2014.

Concepts in Chinese folk religion